Podolsky (masculine), Podolskaya (feminine), or Podolskoye (neuter) is the name of several rural localities in Russia:
Podolsky, Republic of Bashkortostan, a village in Maysky Selsoviet of Iglinsky District of the Republic of Bashkortostan
Podolsky, Chelyabinsk Oblast, a settlement in Krasninsky Selsoviet of Verkhneuralsky District of Chelyabinsk Oblast
Podolsky, Krasnodar Krai, a khutor under the administrative jurisdiction of  Neftegorsky Settlement Okrug, Apsheronsky District, Krasnodar Krai
Podolsky, Saratov Oblast, a settlement in Pitersky District of Saratov Oblast
Podolskoye, Galichsky District, Kostroma Oblast, a village in Orekhovskoye Settlement of Galichsky District of Kostroma Oblast
Podolskoye, Krasnoselsky District, Kostroma Oblast, a selo in Podolskoye Settlement of Krasnoselsky District of Kostroma Oblast
Podolskoye, Tver Oblast, a village in Vesyegonsky District of Tver Oblast
Podolskoye, Vologda Oblast, a village in Podolsky Selsoviet of Ustyuzhensky District of Vologda Oblast
Podolskoye, Blagoveshchensky Rural Okrug, Bolsheselsky District, Yaroslavl Oblast, a village in Blagoveshchensky Rural Okrug of Bolsheselsky District of Yaroslavl Oblast
Podolskoye, Markovsky Rural Okrug, Bolsheselsky District, Yaroslavl Oblast, a village in Markovsky Rural Okrug of Bolsheselsky District of Yaroslavl Oblast
Podolskoye, Breytovsky District, Yaroslavl Oblast, a village in Sutkovsky Rural Okrug of Breytovsky District of Yaroslavl Oblast
Podolskoye, Nekouzsky District, Yaroslavl Oblast, a village in Nekouzsky Rural Okrug of Nekouzsky District of Yaroslavl Oblast
Podolskoye, Rybinsky District, Yaroslavl Oblast, a village in Pogorelsky Rural Okrug of Rybinsky District of Yaroslavl Oblast
Podolskoye, Tutayevsky District, Yaroslavl Oblast, a village in Chebakovsky Rural Okrug of Tutayevsky District of Yaroslavl Oblast
Podolskaya, Arkhangelsk Oblast, a village in Vyysky Selsoviet of Verkhnetoyemsky District of Arkhangelsk Oblast
Podolskaya, Novgorod Oblast, a village in Semenovshchinskoye Settlement of Valdaysky District of Novgorod Oblast
Podolskaya, Vologda Oblast, a village in Terebayevsky Selsoviet of Nikolsky District of Vologda Oblast